Sir Arlington Griffith Butler  (2 January 1938 – 9 November 2017) was a Bahamian teacher, lawyer, and politician.

He was born on 2 January 1938 in Nassau. Butler attended the Bahamas Teachers College, the University of Nottingham, and the Longborough Training College. He was an administrator at Government High School and Prince William High School. Butler became a lawyer in 1974.

He first ran for a seat on the House of Assembly representing the Progressive Liberal Party in 1967, and lost. Butler contested the next year's elections, and won. He was reelected in 1972 and served as Speaker of the House of Assembly from that year until 1977, when he left the PLP. Butler launched an unsuccessful independent campaign in 1977, and later joined the Free National Movement. He ran under the FNM banner in 1982 and 1987, but never returned to parliament. Butler was Minister of Public Safety and Transport between 1992 and 1995 under the Hubert Ingraham government. He was named ambassador to the United States from 1996 to 1997. Outside of politics, Bulter was the longtime president of the Bahamas Olympic Committee.

Butler died at the Princess Margaret Hospital on 9 November 2017, aged 79.

References

1938 births
2017 deaths
People from Nassau, Bahamas
Alumni of the University of Nottingham
Government ministers of the Bahamas
Speakers of the House of Assembly of the Bahamas
Bahamian lawyers
Ambassadors of the Bahamas to the United States
Knights Commander of the Order of St Michael and St George
Progressive Liberal Party politicians
Free National Movement politicians
20th-century Bahamian lawyers